Wing Commander Humphrey de Verd Leigh, OBE, DFC, AFC (1897–1980) was a Royal Air Force officer.

Leigh's idea during World War II for an anti-submarine spotlight for Coastal Command was developed and named the Leigh Light.

Early life
Humphrey de Verd Leigh was born at Aldershot, Hampshire on 26 July 1897, the son of Agnes Mary Leigh (1859–1944) and John de Verd Leigh (1861–1947), the Vicar of Holy Trinity Church in Aldershot from 1889 to 1912. He was christened by his father at that church in August 1897.

Military career
He was commissioned in the Royal Naval Air Service (RNAS) in 1915, gaining his Royal Aero Club Aviators' Certificate as a Flight Sub-Lieutenant on 13 June 1915 at Hendon. He was promoted Flight Lieutenant in 1916 and served in Mesopotamia (now Iraq) flying seaplanes for the relief of Kut, and went on to serve in the early Royal Air Force (RAF) 1918–19. Resigning his commission in 1919 Leigh went into business, working for many years in the Sudan in the cotton industry. A Freemason, he was initiated into the Walden Lodge No. 1280 at Saffron Walden in 1921, at which time he gave his profession as 'Engineer'.

In 1935 he married Johanna Emily Whitefield Hayes (1910–1999) at Chelsea in London. Their daughter was Ursula de Verd Leigh. In 1939 he and his wife were living at Great Cumberland Place in Marylebone in London with Leigh listing his occupation as Sales Manager for a Bituminous Roofing company.

WWII
Upon the outbreak of World War II Leigh re-joined the RAF in September 1939, serving in Personnel and Staff Duties for Coastal Command from 1939 until 1945.

His successful development of the Leigh Light, at his own volition and risk, and without approval of his senior commanders at the time made a significant contribution to the Battle of the Atlantic (1942).

Appointed an Officer of the Order of the British Empire on 1 January 1943, having been awarded the Air Force Cross on 8 June 1941, in 1954 he resigned his military commission.

Later life
In his latter years he lived at Richmond Hill in Richmond in London, and here he died on 6 June 1980. In his will he left £19,221.

References

External links
 New Zealanders with the Royal Air Force (Vol. I), CHAPTER 14 Battle of the Atlantic, 1942. See note 1
 Technical details of the Leigh Light and photo of Wg Cdr de Verd Leigh.
 Imperial War Museum
 RAF Museum

Royal Air Force officers
Recipients of the Air Force Cross (United Kingdom)
Recipients of the Distinguished Flying Cross (United Kingdom)
Officers of the Order of the British Empire
English aviators
Royal Naval Air Service aviators
Royal Navy officers
Royal Naval Air Service personnel of World War I
Royal Air Force personnel of World War I
Royal Air Force personnel of World War II
1897 births
1980 deaths
Military personnel from Aldershot
Freemasons of the United Grand Lodge of England